Drowners is the debut album by the indie rock band Drowners, released on January 28, 2014.

Track listing

Personnel
 The Drowners - Arranger, Primary Artist
 Matthew Hitt - Composer, Guitar, Lyricist, Vocals
 Eli Janney - Mixing
 Joe Lambert - Mastering
 Gus Oberg - Producer
 Lakis E. Pavlou - Drums
 Jack Ridley III - Guitar, Vocals
 Erik Lee Snyder - Bass
 Peter Zachary Voelker - Photography
 Johnny T. Yerington - Producer

Credits adapted from AllMusic.

References

2014 debut albums
Drowners albums
Frenchkiss Records albums